Rachel Catherine Homan (born April 5, 1989) is a Canadian international curler. Homan is a former Canadian junior champion, a three-time Canadian national champion, and the 2017 world champion, all as a skip. She was also the skip of the Canadian women's curling team at the 2018 Winter Olympics.

During her junior career, Homan competed in two Canadian Junior Curling Championships, placing second in 2009 and winning the championship in 2010. She also won a silver medal at the 2010 World Junior Curling Championships. Throughout her women's career, Homan has medalled at the Scotties Tournament of Hearts, the Canadian women's national curling championships, seven times, winning gold three times (2013, 2014, and 2017), silver three times (2019, 2020, and 2021), and bronze once (2015). She has competed in three World Women's Curling Championships, winning gold in 2017, silver in 2014, and bronze in 2013. She has also competed in two Canadian Olympic Curling Trials, finishing in third place in 2013 and winning in 2017. At the 2018 Winter Olympics, her team finished in sixth place. In 2019, Homan was named the fourth-greatest Canadian female curler in history by The Sports Network (TSN).

Career

Bantam and junior (2003–2010)
Homan began curling at the age of five, playing in the Little Rock program at the Rideau Curling Club in Ottawa. While bantam-aged (under 16), she won four straight provincial championships from 2003 to 2006, while no other curler had won even twice. In 2006, she won the Optimist International Under-18 Curling Tournament, beating Casey Scheidegger in the final. Her team qualified for the 2007 Canada Winter Games in Whitehorse, Yukon, where Homan skipped Team Ontario to a gold medal.

During her first two years at the junior level, Homan did not win a provincial championship. In 2007, her team lost the provincial semifinal to Hollie Nicol's rink. In 2008, her team lost in the final to Danielle Inglis. These losses were allayed by a provincial junior championship in 2009, earning her team a berth at the 2009 Canadian Junior Curling Championships. At the Canadian Juniors, she skipped the Ontario team to a 10–2 record after the round robin, giving her rink a bye to the final, where she lost to the defending champion, Kaitlyn Lawes from Manitoba. Homan won the 2010 provincial championship and represented Ontario at the 2010 Canadian Junior Curling Championships. At the 2010 Canadian Junior Curling Championships, Homan, with Emma Miskew, Laura Crocker, and Lynn Kreviazuk, won the junior national title with an undefeated record of 13 wins and 0 losses – only the fourth women's team to do so. The team represented Canada at the 2010 World Junior Curling Championships in Flims, Switzerland. The team lost just one round robin game and lost in the final to Sweden's team, skipped by Anna Hasselborg.

Prior to graduating from juniors in 2010, Homan's junior team was too young to participate in Scotties Tournament of Hearts playdowns (as juniors were ineligible to enter provincial playdowns until 2016), but this did not stop her from participating in Women's World Curling Tour events. Homan's top accomplishments on the tour while she was junior-aged included winning two straight Southwestern Ontario Women's Charity Cashspiels. In 2007, she defeated then-World Champion Jennifer Jones in the semifinal and Ève Bélisle in the final, and in 2008 she won in the final against the Chinese national team, skipped by Wang Bingyu. Her team earned $11,000 for each win. In 2009, she won the AMJ Campbell Shorty Jenkins Classic, winning $5,500 for her team. Later that year, her team participated in the Canadian Olympic Curling Pre-Trials, where her team finished with a 3–3 record, and therefore did not qualify for the "Roar of the Rings", Canada's Olympic Trials.

In 2009, Homan's rink was named the World Curling Tour's "rookie team of the year."

Early women's (2010–2012)
In her first year of eligibility, Homan qualified for and won the 2011 Ontario Scotties Tournament of Hearts. At the 2011 Scotties Tournament of Hearts, Homan skipped the Ontario team, finishing the round robin in third place and beating Nova Scotia's Heather Smith-Dacey in the 3 vs. 4 game, before losing in the semi-final to Saskatchewan's Amber Holland, thus eliminating her from the final. She then lost in the bronze medal game to Smith-Dacey.

In April 2011, Homan played third for her brother Mark, and won the 2012 Ontario Mixed Championship. The team, which also included Brian Fleischhaker and teammate in women's play Alison Kreviazuk, represented Ontario at the 2012 Canadian Mixed Curling Championship in November 2011. The team finished with an 8–5 record and out of the playoffs.

That same month, Homan's women's team made it to her first career Grand Slam final, when she lost to Jennifer Jones in the final of the 2011 Players' Championship. Later in 2011, she played in her first Canada Cup where her team finished with a 2–4 record.

Homan once again qualified for the provincial Scotties Tournament of Hearts in 2012. Her team went undefeated throughout the round robin. However, they lost in the final to Tracy Horgan's rink from Sudbury. Homan, who was up by one point with the hammer, missed a draw to the button to clinch the victory on her final rock. Instead, she gave up three points and lost.

Scotties champions and world bronze medallists (2012–2013)
In her first Grand Slam event of the 2012–13 curling season, the 2012 Curlers Corner Autumn Gold Curling Classic, Homan's team lost to Sherry Middaugh in the final. In the second Grand Slam event of the season, the 2012 Manitoba Lotteries Women's Curling Classic, Homan's rink once again lost in the final, this time to Stefanie Lawton. Homan lost in the semi-final of the third Slam of the season, the 2012 Colonial Square Ladies Classic, but followed it up with her first-ever Grand Slam victory at the 2012 Masters of Curling, where she beat Chelsea Carey in the final. Outside of the Grand Slams, Homan won her 2nd Royal LePage OVCA Women's Fall Classic in 2012.

Later in the season, Homan qualified for her second Scotties Tournament of Hearts by going undefeated at the 2013 Ontario Scotties Tournament of Hearts. Homan began the 2013 Scotties Tournament of Hearts in Kingston, Ontario, by winning the Ford Hot Shots skills competition. At the Scotties, the team lost just one game in the round robin, to Manitoba's Jennifer Jones. This gave the rink a 10–1 record, second behind Manitoba, who went undefeated. However, in their first playoff game, the Homan rink defeated Jones 8–5. This put the Homan team in the final, where they faced Jones once again, and won 9–6. With the victory, the Homan rink became the first Ottawa-based team to win the Canadian women's curling championship. The win earned Homan and her team the right to represent Canada at the 2013 World Women's Curling Championship in Riga, Latvia.

At the World championships, the Homan rink led Canada to an 8–3 round robin finish, which put them in third place. In the playoffs, they beat the United States (skipped by Erika Brown) in the 3 vs. 4 game, then lost to Scotland (skipped by Eve Muirhead) in the semi-final, after Homan missed her last shot of the game, jamming a double takeout. After the loss, Homan defeated the Americans again, this time in the bronze medal game. The Homan rink finished the season by losing in the quarter-final of the 2013 Players' Championship.

Scotties repeat champions and world silver medallists (2013–2014)
Starting the 2013–14 curling season, Homan's team played in four events on the World Curling Tour before winning the 2013 Masters, beating Eve Muirhead in the final. They had previously beaten Homan in the semi-finals of the 2013 Curlers Corner Autumn Gold Curling Classic. Homan's team had made the playoffs in every Grand Slam event in the previous season; however, they failed to make the playoffs at the 2013 Colonial Square Ladies Classic.

Homan's success over the previous three seasons qualified her team for an automatic entry at the 2013 Canadian Olympic Curling Trials. There, the team qualified for playoffs with a 4–3 round robin record, in second place. They lost to Sherry Middaugh in the semi-final, ending the team's 2014 Olympic hopes.

As defending Scotties champions from 2013, the Homan rink represented Team Canada at the  2014 Scotties Tournament of Hearts in Montreal. The event was notable for the absence of Jennifer Jones, who was competing at the Olympics. The Homan team went through the entire tournament undefeated without ever having to throw their last rock and defeated Alberta's Val Sweeting in the final. Homan became the youngest skip ever to win back-to-back Scotties. Homan was awarded the Sandra Schmirler Most Valuable Player Award, and ended the event with a 90% shooting percentage based on overall shot successes throughout the event, the highest of any skip in the tournament.

Homan's 2014 Scotties win earned her team a berth at the 2014 Ford World Women's Curling Championship in Saint John, New Brunswick. The team had a better event than the previous year, as they only lost one round robin game to finish first place heading into the playoffs. The team defeated Switzerland's Binia Feltscher in the 1 vs. 2 page playoff game, but lost in a rematch in the final. Homan and her Canadian team thus settled for a silver medal.

The Homan rink ended the season with a loss in the final of the 2014 Players' Championship against the Olympic gold medallist Jennifer Jones. The match marked the last game on the team for second Alison Kreviazuk, as she moved to Sweden to be with her boyfriend Fredrik Lindberg, who played for Niklas Edin. Kreviazuk, who had played for Homan since they were bantam-aged, was replaced by Joanne Courtney from Edmonton.

Joanne Courtney joins the team (2014–2017)
The Homan rink found less success in the 2014–15 curling season after adding new second Joanne Courtney to the team. The team did not win any Slam events, losing in the finals of the 2014 Curlers Corner Autumn Gold Curling Classic (against Jennifer Jones) and the 2014 Canadian Open of Curling (against Eve Muirhead). The team also lost in the final of the 2014 Canada Cup of Curling against Val Sweeting. As defending champions, the team represented Team Canada at the 2015 Scotties Tournament of Hearts. The team finished the round robin in 4th place with a 7–4 record. In the playoffs, they lost to Saskatchewan's Stefanie Lawton in the 3 vs. 4 game, but rebounded in the bronze medal game in a re-match against the Lawton rink, beating them 7–5. That season, the team won one World Curling Tour event, the Pomeroy Inn & Suites Prairie Showdown held in March. The team also won the inaugural 2015 Pinty's All-Star Curling Skins Game, earning them $52,000.

The team found more success at the start of the 2015–16 curling season. They began the season with a win in the Stu Sells Oakville Tankard, followed by a loss in the final of the first Slam, the 2015 GSOC Tour Challenge, against Switzerland's Silvana Tirinzoni. The team then won six World Curling Tour events in a row, the Stockholm Ladies Cup, the Curlers Corner Autumn Gold Curling Classic, the 2015 Masters of Curling, the 2015 National, the 2015 Canada Cup of Curling and the 2015 Canadian Open of Curling, amassing a huge lead in both the World Curling Tour Order of Merit and Money standings in the process. After this impressive run, they were upset in the finals of the 2016 Ontario Scotties Tournament of Hearts against their club mates, the Jenn Hanna team, meaning the World number one-ranked Homan team would not be able to play in the national championships that year. The team was invited to play in the 2016 Elite 10 men's Grand Slam event, making history as the first women's team to compete in a men's Grand Slam event. The team won one game in the event against Charley Thomas.  The team ended the season losing against Jennifer Jones in the final of the 2016 Humpty's Champions Cup. The Homan rink's success over the course of the season meant the team finished the season ranked first in the world in both the women's money list and order of merit standings.

Homan's team began the 2016–17 season by winning their first event, the 2016 AMJ Campbell Shorty Jenkins Classic. They then won the 2016 Canad Inns Women's Classic the following month. A week later, the team lost in the final of the 2016 Masters of Curling against the Allison Flaxey rink. A month later, they lost to Jennifer Jones in the final of the 2016 Canada Cup of Curling. The rink lost 2 games in the round robin of the 2017 Ontario Scotties Tournament of Hearts, finishing second in the round robin behind Jacqueline Harrison. They won both their playoff matches, including defeating Harrison in the final, qualifying the team to represent Ontario at the 2017 Scotties Tournament of Hearts. In the final, Team Homan defeated Manitoba's Michelle Englot to win the Scotties, her third Scotties title in four years. Both teams went 10–1 in the round robin, with Homan's lone loss against Englot. Englot beat Homan once again in the 1 vs. 2 game, then Homan beat Northern Ontario's (Krista McCarville) in the semi-final to force the re-match against Englot in the final. At the 2017 world championship in Beijing, Homan's rink became the third team in tournament history to go unbeaten in round-robin play, joining fellow Canadian Colleen Jones from 2003 and Sweden's Anette Norberg from 2005.  She went unbeaten right to the end, the first team to do so, winning the gold medal by beating Anna Sidorova (for the 3rd consecutive time, with wins in the round robin, 1 vs. 2 playoff game, and final) 8–3 for the gold medal, her first world title and completing her medal set at worlds. The Homan rink finished the season by winning the 2017 Humpty's Champions Cup. In mixed doubles, Homan and partner John Morris were runners-up at the 2017 Canadian Mixed Doubles Curling Championship, losing to Joanne Courtney and Reid Carruthers in the final.

Olympic run (2017–2018)
Homan began the 2017–18 curling season by winning the 2017 Prestige Hotels & Resorts Curling Classic and then the Curlers Corner Autumn Gold Curling Classic the following week.  Homan and her team won the 2017 Canadian Olympic Curling Trials in her hometown of Ottawa, defeating previously unbeaten Chelsea Carey in the final. The Homan rink lost just one game in the tournament, against Carey in the round robin. In her first event since winning the trials, Homan curled just 64% at the 2018 Continental Cup of Curling as a member of Team North America. Her team's record at the event was 0–3–1, and she also lost in her mixed doubles match with Brett Gallant. Despite this, Team North America won the event on a draw to the button by Brad Gushue, breaking a 30–30 tie. The team then played at the 2018 Winter Olympics, where they started with 3 consecutive losses. Losing to the team from Denmark meant that Canada was 0–3 for the first time ever at an Olympics. The game against Denmark was marked with controversy when Denmark burned a rock as it was coming to a rest, when a sweeper touched the rock with their broom. Rather than letting the rock be adjusted, Homan removed the stone. Joan McCusker, commentating for CBC at the Olympics, said of Homan's move that "I think that was a rash move to take it off. They should have left it in play. It doesn't look good on you." Homan and team won their next three games to stay in playoff contention but lost their next two, with their fifth loss against Eve Muirhead officially eliminating them from medal contention. This made Homan's team the first Canadian Olympic curlers to not play for or win a medal. The team went winless at the 2018 Players' Championship in April, but they won the final event of the year, the 2018 Humpty's Champions Cup, defeating Kerri Einarson in the final.

Post-Olympics (2018–2020)
Team Homan began the 2018–19 curling season by winning the first leg of the Curling World Cup, defeating Sweden's Anna Hasselborg in the final. The following month, Hasselborg defeated Homan in the final of the 2018 Masters. Homan won the next Grand Slam event, the 2018 Tour Challenge, defeating Tracy Fleury in the final. At the 2018 Canada Cup, the Homan rink went 5–2 in the round robin and lost in the semifinal to Jennifer Jones. A week later, the team won the 2018 National, beating Kerri Einarson in the final. The next month, Homan won her third Grand Slam of the season, the 2019 Meridian Canadian Open, defeating Silvana Tirinzoni in the final. A week later, she participated in the 2019 Continental Cup on Team North America, losing to Team World. She won one game in the event, in the mixed team scramble. Homan and her rink played in the 2019 Ontario Scotties Tournament of Hearts, having missed the previous year's event due to the Olympics and having won the 2017 Scotties. At the event, the team lost just one game and won their fourth provincial title. The event was marked by an incident of bullying aimed at Homan. A "number of curlers" at the event voted for her to win the tournament's sportsmanship award to protest the fact that the team had two members (Homan and Courtney) living in Alberta. Teams were only allowed one out-of-province "import" player; however, Homan maintained a residence in Ontario and was exempted from requirements as she was a full-time student in Edmonton. At the 2019 Scotties Tournament of Hearts, her team finished the round robin at 5–2, moving on to the championship pool, where they finished at 8–3, in third place. The team qualified for the final, beating Northern Ontario's Krista McCarville in the 3 vs. 4 game and Saskatchewan's Robyn Silvernagle in the semi-final. They lost the final to Alberta's Chelsea Carey in an extra end, despite leading 5–1 in the fourth end. At the 2019 Players' Championship, the team missed the playoffs after posting a 2–3 round robin record and losing a tie-breaker to Satsuki Fujisawa. They finished the season with a semi-final finish at the 2019 Champions Cup.  In 2019, Homan was named the fourth-greatest Canadian female curler in history by The Sports Network (TSN), the main television broadcaster of major curling events, following a poll of broadcasters, reporters and top curlers.

In their first event of the 2019–20 season, Team Homan made the semi-finals of the 2019 AMJ Campbell Shorty Jenkins Classic. They then won the 2019 Colonial Square Ladies Classic. In mid-October, the team made the final of the 2019 Canad Inns Women's Classic, losing to Elena Stern. They missed the playoffs at all four Slams of the season as both the Players' Championship and the Champions Cup were cancelled due to the COVID-19 pandemic. Team Homan won the first spot in the 2021 Canadian Olympic Curling Trials by defeating Tracy Fleury in the final of the 2019 Canada Cup. The team went undefeated at the 2020 Ontario Scotties Tournament of Hearts, defeating Hollie Duncan in the final. At the 2020 Scotties Tournament of Hearts, they won their second straight silver medal, losing the final to Manitoba's Kerri Einarson.

Sarah Wilkes joins the team (2020–2022)
Team Homan announced on March 12, 2020, that the team was parting ways with longtime lead Lisa Weagle. On March 17, 2020, the team announced they would be adding Sarah Wilkes as their new second, with Joanne Courtney moving to lead.

The 2021 Ontario provincial playdowns were cancelled due to the COVID-19 pandemic in Ontario. As the 2020 provincial champions, Homan's team was chosen to represent Ontario at the 2021 Scotties Tournament of Hearts in Calgary. Up to that point, Homan had only played in one tour game the entire season in the Okotoks Ladies Classic in November, before that event was cancelled due to a province-wide shutdown in Alberta. Three months later, Homan entered the 2021 Scotties at eight months pregnant. She had a successful round robin, with a 7–1 record, including a win against defending champion Kerri Einarson. She entered the championship pool as the first seed, where she won three games and lost one to Manitoba's Jennifer Jones. Because of their earlier win against Einarson, Homan's team received a bye to the final. There, they lost 9–7 to Einarson after Homan missed a freeze in the last end, resulting in Einarson not needing to throw her last rock. Homan was named Second Team All-Star skip for the tournament. A month after the Scotties, Homan gave birth to her second child, Bowyn of March 25, and missed the 2021 Canadian Mixed Doubles Curling Championship in the process (she had qualified with John Morris). Having just given birth three weeks prior, she had originally planned on not playing in the two Slams scheduled for the end of the season, but later decided she was physically able to do so. At the first of Slam, the 2021 Champions Cup, she had no problem claiming her 11th career Slam title, defeating Silvana Tirinzoni in the final. A week later she played in the 2021 Players' Championship, the last event for Team Homan of the season. At the Players', she led her team all the way to the final, before losing to Einarson in a re-match of the Scotties final.

Team Homan made it to the quarterfinals of their first slam of the year, the 2021 Masters, where they were beaten by Alina Kovaleva. Two weeks later, they played in the 2021 National, where they were eliminated in the quarters again, this time by Anna Hasselborg. Next for Team Homan was the 2021 Canadian Olympic Curling Trials where they attempted to qualify for the Olympics again. The team, however, did not have a successful week, finishing with a 2–6 record. Team Homan's record over the season was not good enough to give them an automatic qualifying spot at the 2022 Ontario Scotties Tournament of Hearts, forcing them to play in an open qualifier. The team did qualify at the Open Qualifier, but the Ontario Scotties were postponed due to new COVID-19 regulations put into place by the province, shutting down sports event. The spread of COVID-19's omicron variant also cancelled the 2022 Canadian Mixed Doubles Curling Olympic Trials which Homan was set to participate in with John Morris. With the postponement of the Ontario Scotties, CurlON announced that they would be selecting Team Hollie Duncan over Team Homan to represent Ontario if Homan was selected to represent Canada in the mixed doubles event at the 2022 Olympics (as the Trials had been cancelled). However, if Homan wasn't selected, then CurlON would select Team Homan to play in the Scotties instead. This plan of action was considered confusion and disappointing to the teams involved. Homan would end up being selected to represent Canada at the Olympics, giving Team Duncan the right to represent Ontario at the 2022 Scotties. However, Team Homan (sans Homan) qualified for the Scotties as Team Wild Card #3. For the Tournament of Hearts, Homan's teammates Emma Miskew, Sarah Wilkes and Joanne Courtney added Allison Flaxey to their lineup. At the championship, the team finished with a 4–4 record, not advancing to the playoff round.

At the mixed doubles event at the Olympics, Homan and Morris struggled, finishing with a 5–4 record. Their record was tied for fourth with Sweden's Almida de Val and Oskar Eriksson, however, due to their head-to-head loss against the Swedish pair, they missed the playoffs. The pair missed their chance at a spot by mere millimetres, as their final shot in their last game against Italy went too far, thus losing the game. Team Homan had to wait until April 2022 to play in the postponed Ontario Hearts, which they ended up winning, beating Carly Howard in the final. The team wrapped up their season with the two final slams, making it to the semifinals at the 2022 Players' Championship where they lost to Anna Hasselborg, and the quarters of the 2022 Champions Cup, where they lost to Kerri Einarson.

In March 2022, after Joanne Courtney announced she would be stepping back from competitive curling, it was announced that Tracy Fleury would be joining the team for the 2022–23 season. They did not announce whether Homan or Fleury would skip the new lineup.

Personal life
Homan was born at the Ottawa Civic Hospital in Ottawa to parents Cathy and Craig Homan. She has an older brother, Mark, who is also a curler. Growing up in the Ottawa suburb of Orleans, Homan attended Cairine Wilson Secondary School and graduated from the University of Ottawa with a degree in Human Kinetics in 2011. She graduated from the University of Alberta with a bachelor's degree in education in 2020. She married Shawn Germain, a former professional hockey player from Edmonton, in September 2016. They live in Beaumont, Alberta, and used to live in St. Paul, Alberta. Homan gave birth to a son, Ryatt Mitch Germain, in June 2019, and a daughter, Bowyn, in March 2021.  She is a fan of the Ottawa Senators NHL team.

Year-by-year statistics

Team events

Mixed doubles

Teams

Grand Slam record

Former events

Notes

References

External links

Team Website

Living people
1989 births
Curlers from Ottawa
Canadian women curlers
Canadian women's curling champions
World curling champions
University of Ottawa alumni
University of Alberta alumni
Continental Cup of Curling participants
Curlers at the 2018 Winter Olympics
Olympic curlers of Canada
People from the County of St. Paul No. 19
Canada Cup (curling) participants
People from Edmonton Metropolitan Region
Curlers at the 2022 Winter Olympics
Canadian schoolteachers